Tiger bread (Dutch: Tijgerbrood), also known as Dutch crunch and under various brandnames, is a bread of Dutch origin that has a mottled crust.

Crust
The bread is generally made with a pattern baked onto the top made by painting rice paste onto the surface prior to baking. The rice paste that imparts the bread's characteristic flavour dries and cracks during the baking process. The bread itself has a crusty exterior, but is soft inside. Typically, tiger bread is made as a white bread bloomer loaf or bread roll, but the technique can be applied to any shape of bread.

Other names
The name originated in the Netherlands, where it is known as tijgerbrood or tijgerbol (tiger roll), and where it has been sold at least since the early 1970s.  The US supermarket chain Wegmans sells it as "Marco Polo" bread. In the San Francisco Bay Area it is called Dutch Crunch.

In January 2012, the UK supermarket chain Sainsbury's announced that it would market the product under the name "giraffe bread", after a three-year-old girl's parents wrote to the company to suggest it.

References

Breads
Dutch cuisine